Sep. 19 - Eastern Orthodox liturgical calendar - Sep. 21

All fixed commemorations below celebrated on October 3 by Eastern Orthodox Churches on the Old Calendar.

For September 19th, Orthodox Churches on the Old Calendar commemorate the Saints listed on September 7.

Saints
 Great-martyr Eustathius Placidas, his wife Martyr Theopistes, and their sons Martyrs Agapius and Theopistus, of Rome (118)
 Martyrs Artemidorus and Thallos, by the sword.
 Martyr John the Confessor, of Egypt, beheaded in Palestine, and with him 40 martyrs (295 or 310)
 Saints Theodore and Euprepius, and two men named Anastasius (7th century), confessors and disciples of Saint Maximos the Confessor.
 Hieromartyrs Hypatius, Bishop of Ephesus and Andrew the Presbyter, Confessors of the Holy Icons, under Leo III the Isaurian (8th century)  (see also: September 21)
 Venerable John the Godbearer, of Crete, monk (1031)
 Venerable Meletius of Cyprus, Bishop.  (see also: September 21)

Pre-Schism Western saints
 Saint Candida, a virgin-martyr in Carthage in North Africa under Maximian Herculeus (c. 300)
 Saint Glycerius, Archbishop of Milan, Confessor (438)
 Saint Agapitus I, Pope of Rome (536)  (see also: April 17 - East)
 Saint Vincent Madelgarius, Benedictine monk (677)
 Saint Eusebia of Saint-Cyr, Benedictine Abbess of a convent in Marseilles in France, martyred with some forty nuns by the Saracens at Saint-Cyr (c. 731)

Post-Schism Orthodox saints
 Saint Eustathius of Thessalonica, Archbishop of Thessalonica (1197)
 Holy Martyrs Blessed Prince Michael of Chernigov, and his counsellor Theodore of Chernigov, Wonderworkers (1245)
 Saint Oleg Romanovich, Prince of Bryansk (1285)
 Right-believing Prince John of Putyvl, Ukraine (14th century)
 New Monk-martyr Hilarion the Cretan, of St. Anne’s Skete, Mt. Athos, at Constantinople (1804)

New martyrs and confessors
 New Hieromartyrs Theoctistus Smelnitsky and Alexander Tetiuyev, Priests (1937)

Other commemorations
 Synaxis of the icon of Panagia Voulkaniotissa, in Messinia (1755)
 Synaxis of the Saints of Bryansk.

Icon gallery

Notes

References

Sources
 September 20/October 3. Orthodox Calendar (PRAVOSLAVIE.RU).
 October 3 / September 20. HOLY TRINITY RUSSIAN ORTHODOX CHURCH (A parish of the Patriarchate of Moscow).
 September 20. OCA - The Lives of the Saints.
 The Autonomous Orthodox Metropolia of Western Europe and the Americas (ROCOR). St. Hilarion Calendar of Saints for the year of our Lord 2004. St. Hilarion Press (Austin, TX). p. 70.
 The Twentieth Day of the Month of September. Orthodoxy in China.
 September 20. Latin Saints of the Orthodox Patriarchate of Rome.
 The Roman Martyrology. Transl. by the Archbishop of Baltimore. Last Edition, According to the Copy Printed at Rome in 1914. Revised Edition, with the Imprimatur of His Eminence Cardinal Gibbons. Baltimore: John Murphy Company, 1916. pp. 290–291.
 Rev. Richard Stanton. A Menology of England and Wales, or, Brief Memorials of the Ancient British and English Saints Arranged According to the Calendar, Together with the Martyrs of the 16th and 17th Centuries. London: Burns & Oates, 1892. p. 454.
Greek Sources
 Great Synaxaristes:  20 ΣΕΠΤΕΜΒΡΙΟΥ. ΜΕΓΑΣ ΣΥΝΑΞΑΡΙΣΤΗΣ.
  Συναξαριστής. 20 Σεπτεμβρίου. ECCLESIA.GR. (H ΕΚΚΛΗΣΙΑ ΤΗΣ ΕΛΛΑΔΟΣ).
  20/09/2016. Ορθόδοξος Συναξαριστής. 
Russian Sources
  3 октября (20 сентября). Православная Энциклопедия под редакцией Патриарха Московского и всея Руси Кирилла (электронная версия). (Orthodox Encyclopedia - Pravenc.ru).
  20 сентября по старому стилю  /  3 октября по новому стилю. Русская Православная Церковь - Православный церковный календарь на 2016 год.

September in the Eastern Orthodox calendar